BK Camelopardalis is a variable star in the northern circumpolar constellation of Camelopardalis, near the constellation border with Cassiopeia. It is visible to the naked eye as a faint, blue-white hued star with an apparent visual magnitude that fluctuates around 4.74. The star is located approximately 540 light years away from the Sun based on parallax. It is a proposed member of the Cassiopeia–Taurus group of co-moving stars.

This is a main sequence Be star with a stellar classification of B2.5 Vne, where the 'n' suffix indicates "nebulous" (broad) lines due to rapid rotation. The presence of emission lines in the spectrum has been known since at least 1895. Spectrograms of the star have been taken since 1905, providing a long history of its cycles of variation. It ranges in brightness from a peak of 4.76 down to 4.90.

BK Camelopardalis is 32 million years old and is spinning with a projected rotational velocity of 328 km/s. It has 7.5 times the mass of the Sun and four times the Sun's radius. The star is radiating 1,081 times the luminosity of the Sun from its photosphere at an effective temperature of 18,720 K.

This star lies at the center of a circular, disk-like structure spanning 1.4°, which may be a "magnetic funnel-like structure" that is emitting in the radio band. Neutral hydrogen along the trajectory of this star has been found to be deficient, which may be the result of ionizing radiation from the star.

Two stars have been resolved close to BK Camelopardalis. The first, designated Ab, is separated by about 0.13 arcseconds. If it is physically associated with BK Camelopardalis, it would have an orbital period of several decades. The second star is designated as B but is likely an optical pair with the central BK Camelopardalis; that is, a chance alignment.

Chinese name

References

External links
 HR 985
 CCDM J03201+6540
 Image BK Camelopardalis

B-type main-sequence stars
Be stars

Camelopardalis (constellation)
Durchmusterung objects
020336
015520
0985
Camelopardalis, BK